"Too Much Information" is a song by English new wave band Duran Duran, released in August 1993 as the third single from their seventh studio album, Duran Duran (1993). The song's lyrics deal mainly with the commercialisation of the music industry. In the United Kingdom, it became the band's third top-40 single from the album, while in North America, it peaked at number 45 on the US Billboard Hot 100 and number 26 in Canada.

Release
In the United Kingdom, the 12-inch, cassette, and CD singles were released on 23 August 1993. Those who bought the cassette received a free No Ordinary EP cassette with live tracks ("Hungry Like the Wolf", "Notorious", "Come Undone"), recorded during a performance at Tower Records a few months before. These recordings also appeared as bonus tracks on various global CD releases of the single.

Critical reception
Alan Jones from Music Week gave the song three out of five in his review, describing it as "somewhat less atmospheric than "Come Undone" and more world-weary than "Ordinary World". It won't be as big as either but should still perform well enough to give them another Top 30 hit."

Music video
The accompanying music video for "Too Much Information" was filmed by director Julien Temple in Santa Monica on 27 August and featured the elaborate stage setup designed for the band's 1993 Dilate Your Mind tour.

Personnel
 Simon Le Bon – vocals
 Nick Rhodes – keyboards
 John Taylor – bass
 Warren Cuccurullo – acoustic and electric guitars
 John Jones – keyboards
 Steve Ferrone – drums

Charts

References

 DuranDuran.com
 Duran Duran Collection CZ

Duran Duran songs
1993 singles
1993 songs
Capitol Records singles
Music videos directed by Julien Temple
Parlophone singles
Songs written by John Taylor (bass guitarist)
Songs written by Nick Rhodes
Songs written by Simon Le Bon
Songs written by Warren Cuccurullo